Måns Forsfjäll (born 30 July 2002) is a Swedish professional ice hockey defenceman who plays for Skellefteå AIK of the Swedish Hockey League (SHL). Forsfjäll made his SHL debut during the 2020–21 SHL season.

Career statistics

International

References

External links

2002 births
Living people
People from Skellefteå Municipality
Piteå HC players
Skellefteå AIK players
Swedish ice hockey defencemen
Sportspeople from Västerbotten County